Angela Đelmiš (Serbian Cyrillic: Ангела Ђелмиш; born November 5, 1975) is a Serbian-Hungarian female professional basketball player.

External links
Profile at Eurobasket.com

1975 births
Living people
Sportspeople from Subotica
Serbian women's basketball players
Hungarian women's basketball players
Shooting guards
Serbian expatriate basketball people in Hungary